Darrell "Pidge" Stoker, known as  in the original Japanese language Beast King GoLion, is a fictional character in the media franchise Voltron, and a member of the Voltron Force. The character's first appearance was in Voltron.

Voltron: Defender of the Universe

Pidge is the young genius of the Voltron Lion Force and pilot of the Green Lion. He is the brother of the Vehicle Force team member Chip, though the circumstances of this relationship differ by continuity. Pidge and Chip are twin brothers and were orphaned at a young age. When his foster parents wanted to adopt Pidge, he refused to go unless they took Chip as well.

He and Chip had grown up on Balto, and yet he described himself as an Earth man, implying he was at least of Earth descent (if not born on Earth).

He was part of a scout team, led by Keith, sent to Planet Arus by the Galaxy Alliance. He and the rest of the team were captured by the forces of Planet Doom, and they later escaped.

Crash landing on Arus after their escape, they made their way to the Castle of Lions. There, they met Princess Allura and Coran, and were commissioned as the Voltron Force. Pidge would fly Green Lion.

He would develop a friendship with the Space Mice, even helping them to train to be a fighting force.

A mission would later take an emotional toll on him. Responding to a distress call from planet Balto, He and the Voltron Force arrived and found out that the planet on which he and Chip grew up would explode. Balto exploded after narrowly escaping a trap set up by Prince Lotor.

Voltron Force

Pidge is a technological whiz and the Voltron Force member who pilots the Green Lion. Pidge is a member of Galaxy Garrison. He is ranked as a Tech Sergeant.

Voltron: Legendary Defender

In Voltron: Legendary Defender, Pidge is a teenage girl of Italian descent named Katie "Pidge" Holt, a former communications cadet at the Galaxy Garrison, and current pilot of the Green Lion of Voltron. She is a strategic fighter, and a highly intelligent, versatile hacker and inventor who disguised herself as a boy named "Pidge Gunderson" to search for the truth about her missing family. She's fiercely loyal to her friends and an independent thinker. A shorter-than-average human girl masquerading as a boy, Pidge's appearance reflects her androgynous personal style.

Pidge is the slimmest and shortest of the Paladins. She has brown eyes, fair skin, and disheveled light brown hair. She makes no obvious effort to cut or style her hair, so it tends to form two spikes on either side of her head and unruly bangs. She dons wire-framed, round, circular glasses with fake lenses to address her lack of actual visual impairment.

Comics

In the 2011 Devil's Due comics, the Pidge character is referred to as Darrell "Pidge" Stoker. The comic book version of Pidge depicts him as a growth-stunted 15-year-old, and as an Earthling (as opposed to his cartoon counterpart hailing from the planet Balto). He's also depicted as an orphan abandoned outside a convent when he was six weeks old (however, he may yet have a family because later he talks with Vehicle team member Chip about the similarities that exist between the two of them, he remarks that '[they]'re one DNA test short of discovering [they]'re brothers' which is a nod to the cartoon establishment of Pidge and Chip as twins). During his years at the orphanage, his scores on a state-mandated IQ test caught the eye of the New West Point military academy, who promptly enrolled him to put his awe-inspiring understanding of computer systems to good use. However, his life at NWP turned out to be worse than at the orphanage, and was the subject of regular beatings by his intellectually-threatened peers, until he was approached by Colonel Hawkins to join a team of outcasts to search for the legendary robot Voltron on the distant planet Arus. Pidge didn't have to be asked twice, and promptly agreed.

References

Television characters introduced in 1984
Voltron
Male characters in animation
Female characters in animation
Fictional male martial artists
Fictional female martial artists
Fictional military personnel
Fictional hackers
Fictional technopaths
Fictional programmers